"Let's Have a Party" is a song whose best-known version was released by Wanda Jackson in 1958.

It may also refer to:
"Let's Have a Party" (rag), a 1953 ragtime medley by Winifred Atwell
Let's Have a Party (Rivieras album), 1964
Let's Have a Party (1982 Wanda Jackson album), 1982
Let's Have a Party (1995 Wanda Jackson album), 1995